Khlong Bang Len is a watercourse in Nakhon Pathom Province, Thailand. It is a tributary of the Tha Chin River.

Bang Len